Misty, known as  in Japan, is a fictional character in the Pokémon franchise owned by Nintendo and created by Satoshi Tajiri. She has appeared as a Gym Leader in the Pokémon video games Pokémon Red and Blue, Pokémon Gold and Silver, and their respective remakes. She was a protagonist in the ongoing anime for the first five seasons, travelling alongside Ash Ketchum and Brock / Tracey to become the world's best Water-type Pokémon trainer before departing home to Cerulean City to run the family gym, but made recurring appearances after. The character has also appeared in manga like Pokémon Adventures. She specialises in Water Type Pokémon. Her Japanese voice actress is Mayumi Iizuka, while her English voice was supplied by Rachael Lillis and Michele Knotz, while her Korean voice was supplied by Ji Mi-Ae, Lee Chi-Hyeon, Kim Hyeon-Ji and Yeo Minjeong.

Design
Misty's character design was overseen by Ken Sugimori and Atsuko Nishida, and for the anime the design was overseen by Sayuri Ichishi. Her Japanese voice actress, Mayumi Iizuka, stated that during her audition the director asked her to act like herself, and in doing so she landed the role. As a result, she considers Misty to be the one character she has voiced who most represents herself. Mayumi keeps track of her character's promotional appearances in merchandise and other material, additionally providing fans with insights on possible future cameos in the anime series.

Appearances

In the video games
In the video games Pokémon Red, Blue, Yellow, FireRed & LeafGreen, Pokémon Gold, Silver, Crystal, Pokémon HeartGold and SoulSilver, and Pokémon: Let's Go, Pikachu! and Let's Go, Eevee!, Misty is the Gym Leader of Cerulean City. She specializes in Water-type Pokémon. Misty, in her anime form, also appears as a trophy in Super Smash Bros. Melee and as a gym leader in Pokémon Puzzle League. Additionally, she appears on Pokémon Channel on a full Japanese Pichu Bros. Disc. The disc differs from the other Japanese disc, as Misty's (Kasumi) voice actor is the narrator. Misty, as well as most of the gym leaders in Pokémon history, reappear in Pokémon Black 2 and White 2 as part of the Pokémon World Tournament.

In the anime
The anime follows the quest of one of the main characters, Ash Ketchum, as he and his friends travel around the fictitious world of Pokémon along with their Pokémon partners. Misty is a stubborn tomboy who trains Water Pokémon and has three siblings, Daisy, Lily and Violet.  She left the Gym to her three older sisters prior to traveling with Ash in the anime, although she still retained the title of Gym Leader despite this. She first comes across Ash when she accidentally fishes him and his Pikachu out of a river while fishing for water Pokémon. Soon after this incident, Ash "borrows" her bike in an attempt to flee from a flock of wild Spearow. The bike is later charred by an attack from Pikachu. Misty tells Ash she will not leave him alone until he replaces the bike and commits to follow him on his journey, and the two soon become best friends. After retrieving her repaired bike at the end of the Johto League Silver Conference, she returns to the Cerulean Gym and resumes her duties as the Gym Leader.

Misty becomes a central character in Pokémon Chronicles, a spin-off to the Pokémon anime, and appears in several specials and episodes. She maintains her friendship with Ash and eventually goes to Hoenn to meet up with him, meeting May and Max, and sees him again when he returns to Pallet following a long stint in Hoenn. She also appeared in an arc composed of at least two episodes of the Sun & Moon series, where she and Brock meet Ash and his friends in Kanto, and later appears in two more episodes of the Sun & Moon series when she reunites with Ash in Alola. Misty will make another appearance in Pokémon Ultimate Journeys: The Series as Ash's journey with the show comes to end.

In the early episodes, Misty is depicted as having a short temper, stubborn temperament, and little patience. As the series progresses, however, she gradually shows herself to be kind and sensible. Misty becomes the parental guardian of Togepi, caring for it throughout the series. Misty constantly reins in Brock when he becomes enamored with pretty girls, often pulling him away by the ear. She is also terrified of most Bug-type Pokémon. Misty aims to be a world-class Water-type Pokémon trainer despite her sisters' ridicule.

In the manga
The Misty character that appears in the Electric Tale of Pikachu manga series, which is loosely based on the anime, is similar to the Misty in the anime, while the Misty in Pokémon Adventures is similar to the Misty in the video games. She appears throughout Electric Tale of Pikachu, traveling on occasion with Ash. In Pokémon Adventures, When Red, the protagonist of the manga, first meets her, she is trying to recapture her Gyarados with help of her Staryu, which has been brainwashed by Team Rocket. They decide to team up and confront Team Rocket. The next morning, after spending the night resting in Misty's mansion, Misty leads Red to her Gym and reveals herself to be the Gym Leader. They have a battle, and though Misty quickly gained the upper hand and easily defeated Red with her fast and strong Starmie, she is worried that if they do not prepare themselves, Team Rocket will defeat them easily. Red decides that he might actually need training, and agrees to train. At that point, they become close friends.

In Pocket Monsters, Red, the protagonist of the series, is seeking a Moon Stone along with his Pikachu and his Clefairy (one that speaks human language). When they meet Misty, Clefairy notices that she is wearing a Moon Stone as a necklace. Misty declares that they battle her if they wish to have it. While the Clefairy is initially pumped up to battle, he quickly changes his mind when he sees that his opponent is a massive Blastoise. After a while, the battle is won when Clefairy sucks up all the water in a nearby river and releases the water onto Misty's Pokémon, sending it flying into the sky. Just when Misty is about to reward Red's group with the prize they sought, the stone is stolen.

Critical reception
The book The Japanification of Children's Popular Culture described Misty's portrayal in the anime as a mother figure, calling her a "nurturing component" for the original trio of herself, Ash and Brock. It further described her as an "unusually 'complete' girl of the cartoon world", noting both her feminine sentimentality and her "explosive rage". Anime Classics Zettai!: 100 Must-See Japanese Animation Masterpieces praised the character as being "particularly nuanced" and described her as contributing heavily to the series' appeal. Pikachu's Global Adventure: The Rise and Fall of Pokémon stated that though the anime focused on Ash, Misty was a distinctly significant character especially to young female consumers, neither "butch" nor "dizzily feminine", seemingly "carefully constructed to appeal to preadolescent girls". It added that, unlike other aggressive female characters in the series, Misty did not sacrifice her femininity to succeed, making the character further popular with young American women, a contrast to Japanese children who focused more on the individual Pokémon species to identify with.

In studies on the reactions boys and girls had to the concept of Misty as a heroine in the series, girls accepted it and were eager to associate themselves with the character, while boys attempted to belittle her efforts. On the other hand, children of both genders felt the character alongside Brock gave Ash a sense of identity and moral support, which researchers attributed to the concept of group identity. In another study, children were shown to associate the attributes of attractiveness and aggressiveness, while college students described the character as romantic. Pikachu's Global Adventure additionally stated Misty also served as a source of non-threatening sexuality for both older and younger male viewers, though the context of such was presented in a more subtle way for North American localizations of the series.

In 2013, nearing Halloween, Archie Comics illustrator Ryan Jampole utilized Misty as one of the 31 costumes for the character Roll from the Archie Comics adaptation of the Mega Man franchise.

References

External links

 Misty (anime) on Bulbapedia

Female characters in animated series
Television characters introduced in 1997
Animated characters introduced in 1997
Female characters in anime and manga
Female characters in video games
Female characters in film
Nintendo protagonists
Fictional aquatics sportspeople
Orphan characters in anime and manga
Pokémon characters
Video game bosses
Video game characters introduced in 1996
Animated human characters
Anime and manga sidekicks
Child characters in anime and manga
Child characters in film
Child characters in musical theatre
Child characters in television
Child characters in video games

fr:Personnages de Pokémon#Ondine
pt:Misty